Mollinedia is a genus of flowering plants in the family Monimiaceae. There are about 90 species distributed in the forests of the Neotropics. They are mainly shrubs and trees.

Species include:
 Mollinedia argyrogyna, Perkins
 Mollinedia butleriana, Standl.
 Mollinedia engleriana, Perkins
 Mollinedia gilgiana, Perkins
 Mollinedia glabra, (Sprengel) Perkins
 Mollinedia lamprophylla, Perkins.
 Mollinedia longicuspidata, Perkins.
 Mollinedia marquetiana, Peixoto
 Mollinedia ruae, L.O.Williams
 Mollinedia stenophylla, Perkins

References

 
Monimiaceae genera
Flora of Central America
Flora of South America
Taxonomy articles created by Polbot